Paul Willis (born 1950) is a British cultural theorist.

Paul Willis may also refer to:
 Paul Willis (actor) (1901–1960), American child actor of the silent film era
 Paul Willis (cricketer) (born 1952), English cricketer
 Paul Willis (English footballer) (1970–2011), English football midfielder
 Paul Willis (science communicator), Australian paleontologist and science communicator
 Paul Willis (Scottish footballer) (born 1991), Scottish football midfielder
 Paul K. Willis (1947-1999), Canadian sketch comedian and television/radio writer